Disambiguation: For the director see Inai Shuji.

Inai is a village in Saran district of Bihar state, India. It has Ghaghara River to its south, the Chhapra- Ballia railway line to its north, a small irrigation and flood canal to its west, and Chhapra municipality to its east. it gains significance due to its connection with Ramayana. according to ramayana it was here that the king of Heaven Indra had descended to go to the sage Gautama Maharishi's ashram.  At that time the place was just a forest and was populated later.
the present population is agriculture dependent and the population consists of mainly Hindu Rajputs. Surwar and Chauhan Rajputs are the landed sections while other castes are mainly field hands. the village has two primary, and two middle schools, while the nearest high school is 5 km away.
the village has produced quite a few good volleyball players and cricket is the other main game played here.

Villages in Saran district